The Remington Model 580, 581, and 582 are a family of bolt-action rifles, manufactured from 1967 to 1999. The rifles were introduced as a replacement for the previous Model 511. The 580 series was a lower-cost rifle patterned after the contemporary Model 788 centerfire rifle and shares that rifle's rear-locking bolt.

References

External links
 
 REMINGTON DATES OF MANUFACTURE

Bolt-action rifles of the United States
.22 LR rifles
Remington Arms firearms